Sorkh Gazi (also Romanized as Sorkh Gazī) is a village in Kahnuk Rural District, Irandegan District, Khash County, Sistan and Baluchestan Province, Iran. At the 2006 census, its population was 204, in 37 families.

References 

Populated places in Khash County